Ron Burnett  (born 1947) is an author, professor and the President Emeritus and Research Director for the new Centre for Transdisciplinary Studies at Emily Carr University of Art and Design.

Education
Burnett was born 24 May 1947 in London, England.

In 1981, he received a PhD in Communications Studies from McGill University. He was a professor at La Trobe University in Melbourne from 1983 to 1986 and a teacher, during the 1970s at Vanier College in Montreal. He was the director of the Graduate Program in Communications at McGill University from 1987 to 1996.

Works
Burnett is the author of Cultures of Vision: Images, Media and the Imaginary, published by Indiana University Press in 1995 and How Images Think published by MITPress. He is the editor of Explorations in Film Theory published in 1991 by Indiana University Press. He is the author of over 150 published articles and book chapters. He is an adjunct professor at York University, and is one of the founders of Canadian Film Studies through a journal that he developed and edited, Ciné-Tracts, from 1977 until 1982.

Burnett completed twenty-two years as president and Vice-Chancellor at ECUAD and is now President Emeritus and a Professor and Researcher.

Honours 
 Queen's Golden Jubilee Medal 2002
 iDMAa Outstanding Leadership Award 2010
 Educator of the Year, Canadian New Media Association, 2005
 Order of France: Chevalier of the Ordre des Arts et des Lettres, 2010.
 Queen's Diamond Jubilee Medal, 2012
 Royal Canadian Academy of Arts
 Member of the Order of Canada (2013)
 Member of the Order of British Columbia (2015)

See also
List of Canadian university leaders

References

External links
Official website

Canadian non-fiction writers
Academic staff of the Emily Carr University of Art and Design
Canadian university and college chief executives
Living people
1947 births
Chevaliers of the Ordre des Arts et des Lettres
Academic staff of York University
Members of the Royal Canadian Academy of Arts
Members of the Order of Canada
Members of the Order of British Columbia
McGill University alumni